Hope & Ruin is the fourth full-length studio album by Canadian rock band The Trews. It was released in Canada on April 12, 2011, and it peaked at #9 on the Canadian Albums Chart.

Track listing
All tracks written by The Trews (Colin MacDonald, John-Angus MacDonald, Jack Syperek and Sean Dalton) and Gord Sinclair, unless otherwise noted.

 "Misery Loves Company" - 2:59
 "One By One" - 3:42
 "People of the Deer" - 4:03
 "Stay With Me" - 3:45
 "Hope & Ruin" - 4:01
 "If You Wanna Start Again" - 4:37
 "The World, I Know" (The Trews, Gord Sinclair, Dave Rave) - 2:42
 "Dreaming Man" - 3:53
 "I'll Find Someone Who Will" (The Trews, Gord Sinclair, Ron Hynes) - 3:42
 "Love Is The Real Thing" - 3:06
 "Burned" - 5:09
 "You Gotta Let Me In" - 3:02

References

External links
 The Trews Official website

2011 albums
The Trews albums